The canton of Portes du Couserans is an administrative division of the Ariège department, southern France. It was created at the French canton reorganisation which came into effect in March 2015. Its seat is in Saint-Lizier.

It consists of the following communes:
 
Bagert
Barjac
La Bastide-du-Salat
Bédeille
Betchat
Caumont
Cazavet
Cérizols
Contrazy
Fabas
Gajan
Lacave
Lasserre
Lorp-Sentaraille
Mauvezin-de-Prat
Mauvezin-de-Sainte-Croix
Mercenac
Mérigon
Montardit
Montesquieu-Avantès
Montgauch
Montjoie-en-Couserans
Prat-Bonrepaux
Sainte-Croix-Volvestre
Saint-Lizier
Taurignan-Castet
Taurignan-Vieux
Tourtouse

References

Cantons of Ariège (department)